Vladimir Ippolitovich Zhernakov (November 2, 1878 – 1943) was a merchant, public figure and politician in the Russian Empire and the Soviet Union. The first city head of Novonikolyevsk from 1909 to 1914.

Biography
Vladimir Zhernakov was born into a merchant family in Kolyvan, Tomsk Governorate.

He graduated from the Department of Law of the Saint Petersburg Imperial University.

In 1913, he founded the V. I. Zhernakov & Co Trading House. He also had the shoe store in the Novonikolayevsk City Trade House.

On January 9, 1909, he became the first city head of Novonikolayevsk. On March 17, 1914, he left the post voluntarily.

March 18, 1914, Vladimir Zhernakov became the Honorary Citizen of the City of Novonikolayevsk.

Zhernakov was a supporter of the Novonikolayevsk-Biysk-Semipalatinsk Railway Project. The Altay Railway passed through Novonikolyevsk largely thanks to him, and the city became a major transport hub.

From 1915 to 1916, he was the director of the Novonikolayevsk Flour Milling Partnership.

From 1916 to 1920, he was the director of the Novonikolayevsk Branch of the Siberian Bank.

In 1920, Zhernakov was the technical secretary of the Tomsk Institute of Physical Education.

In 1931, he went to Kharkiv, where he was arrested by the OGPU and sentenced to 5 years for membership in the Cadet Party and public activities during the Civil War. Soon the term was reduced from 5 to 3 years.

Vladimir Zhernakov probably died in 1943.

He was rehabilitated in 1991.

Bibliography

External links
 How Mayors Built Novosibirsk: morgue fees and sewerage through trickery. RIA Novosti. Как мэры строили Новосибирск: поборы на морг и канализация обманом. РИА Новости.
 Tobacco king of the city. NGS.
 Honorary citizens. The Novosibirsk government. Official site.

1878 births
1943 deaths
People from Tomsk Governorate
Merchants from the Russian Empire
Mayors of Novosibirsk
Lawyers from the Russian Empire
Lawyers from Novosibirsk